This article presents a list of the historical events and publications of Australian literature during 1998.

Events 

 Peter Carey (novelist) won the Miles Franklin Award for Jack Maggs

Major publications

Novels 

 Murray Bail, Eucalyptus
 Bryce Courtenay, Jessica
 Luke Davies, Candy: A Novel of Love and Addiction
 Marion Halligan, The Golden Dress
 Roger McDonald, Mr Darwin's Shooter
 Les Murray (poet), Fredy Neptune: A Novel in Verse
 Elliot Perlman, Three Dollars

Children's and young adult fiction 

 Kim Caraher, The Cockroach Cup
 Alison Goodman, Singing the Dogstar Blues
 Phillip Gwynne, Deadly, Unna?
 James Moloney, Angela

Poetry 

 Lee Cataldi, Race Against Time: Poems
 Lucy Dougan, Memory Shell
 Jean Kent (poet), The Satin Bowerbird
 Anthony Lawrence (poet), New and Selected Poems
 Gig Ryan, Pure and Applied

Drama 

 Jane Harrison (playwright), Stolen

Science fiction and fantasy 
 Sara Douglass, Pilgrim
 Greg Egan, Oceanic
 Ian Irvine, A Shadow on the Glass
 Dave Luckett, A Dark Winter
 Jane Routley, Fire Angels

Crime 
 Peter Doyle (writer), Amaze Your Friends
 Andrew Masterson, The Last Days
 Peter Temple, An Iron Rose

Non-fiction 

 Diane Armstrong, Mosaic: A Chronicle of Five Generations
Bruce Bennett and Jennifer Strauss (eds.), The Oxford Literary History of Australia
Raimond Gaita, Romulus, My Father
 Dorothy McRae-McMahon, Everyday Passions: A Conversation on Living
 Mandy Sayer, Dreamtime Alice

Awards and honours 

 John Harber Phillips  "for service to the law, the administration of justice, law reform and education as Chief Justice of the Supreme Court of Victoria, and for his contributions to literature, the visual arts and the community"
 John R. Philip  "for service to the science of hydrology, to scientific communication in promoting the interests of science for the community, and the Australian culture through architecture and literature"
 Anne Fairbairn  "for service to Australian literature as a poet and to international relations, particularly between Australia and the Middle East through translations of poetry and cultural exchanges"
 A. W. Martin  "for service in the field of Australian historiography as a teacher and scholar, and biographer and as foundation professor of the History Department at La Trobe University"
 Elizabeth Burchill  "for service to nursing, particularly as an historian, author and philanthropist"
 Michael Noonan  "for service to the arts as an author of numerous novels, works of non-fiction, television scripts and plays"

Deaths 
A list, ordered by date of death (and, if the date is either unspecified or repeated, ordered alphabetically by surname) of deaths in 1998 of Australian literary figures, authors of written works or literature-related individuals follows, including year of birth.

 23 January — John Forbes (poet), poet (born 1950)
 11 May — John Morrison (writer), novelist and short story writer (born 1904)
 14 May — Kay Glasson Taylor, novelist (born 1893)
 3 July — Elizabeth Riddell, poet and journalist, also known as Betty Riddell (born 1910)
 4 September — Elizabeth Kata, writer whose real name was Elizabeth Katayama (born 1912)
 17 September — Geoffrey Dutton, author and historian (born 1922)
 27 November — Vicki Viidikas, poet and writer (born 1948)

Unknown date

 James McQueen (writer), novelist and short story writer (born 1934)

See also 

 1998 in Australia
 1998 in literature
 1998 in poetry
 List of years in literature
 List of years in Australian literature

References 

1998 in Australia
Australian literature by year
20th-century Australian literature
1998 in literature